Chi Zijian (born 27 February 1964) is a Chinese novelist. She is best known for her novel The Last Quarter of the Moon which won the Mao Dun Literary Prize (2008), one of the most prestigious literature prizes in China.

Biography
Chi was born in Mohe County, Heilongjiang in February 1964. Her father, Chi Zefeng, was the president of a local school. Chi Zijian was named after his father's idol Cao Zijian, a poet and prince of the state of Cao Wei in the Three Kingdoms period.

Chi entered Daxing'anling Normal College in 1981 and she started to publish novels in 1983.

In 1988, Chi was accepted to Northwest University, majoring in writing. One year later, she attended Beijing Normal University and Lu Xun Literary Institute.

In 1990, Chi joined the Heilongjiang Writers Association.

Her novel, The Last Quarter of the Moon, was published in 2005, which won the Mao Dun Literary Prize in 2008.

Chi won the Lu Xun Literary Prize in 1996, 2000, and 2007.

Political career
Chi was a member of the 12th and 13th National Committee of the Chinese People's Political Consultative Conference (CPPCC). On January 15, 2020, she was elected vice-chairwoman of the CPPCC Heilongjiang Provincial Committee.

Works

Novels
 Manchukuo
 The Last Quarter of the Moon

Novellas
 White Snow and Crow
 All Night in the World
 Yellow Chicken and White Wine
 Good Night, Rose

Short stories
 Fog, Moon, and the Cattle Pen
 Qingshui Xichen
 A Jar of Lard

Awards
 6th Zhuang Zhongwen Literary Prize (1993)
 Fog, Moon, and the Cattle Pen – Lu Xun Literary Prize (1996)
 Qingshui Xichen – Lu Xun Literary Prize (2000)
 All Night in the World – Lu Xun Literary Prize (2007)
 The Last Quarter of the Moon – Mao Dun Literature Prize (2008)

Personal life
In 1998, Chi married Huang Shijun, who was the CPC County Committee Secretary of Tahe. In May 2002, Huang died in a car accident.

References

External links

  三捧鲁迅文学奖-迟子建：写作让我笑对痛苦

1964 births
People from Daxing'anling
Northwest University (China) alumni
Beijing Normal University alumni
Short story writers from Heilongjiang
Living people
Chinese women novelists
International Writing Program alumni
Mao Dun Literature Prize laureates
20th-century Chinese short story writers
Chinese women short story writers
People's Republic of China novelists
20th-century women writers
People's Republic of China short story writers